Tale of the Mummy (also known as Russell Mulcahy's Tale of the Mummy and Talos – the Mummy) is a 1998 adventure horror thriller film directed by Russell Mulcahy. The film stars Jason Scott Lee, Jack Davenport, Louise Lombard and Christopher Lee. 

Tale of the Mummy received a theatrical wide release on August 3, 1998, while it was released direct-to-video in 1999.

Plot

In 1948 Egypt, an archeological dig led by Richard Turkel reaches a tomb identified as belonging to Talos, apparently cursed. The hieroglyphics at the entrance warn that all should avoid the place. Despite this, they open the chamber's door only to be blasted with a cloud of dust, causing the archeologists to crumble apart as if made of fragile stone. Richard manages to blow the tomb shut, killing himself in the process.

In 1999, Richard's granddaughter Sam Turkel continues where he left off. They see Talos' sarcophagus suspended from the ceiling when they break into the burial chamber. One of the team falls to his death, and another, Brad, has a seizure while experiencing Talos' past atrocities.

Nine months later, a power cut occurs. The container holding Talos' sarcophagus is broken into, and a guard has his eyes removed. Detective Riley warns them the killer will undoubtedly strike again. At a party, Talos assaults a guest in the bathroom. Talos attacks a man in a car park while Sam explains the core of Talos' myth to Riley. Talos directed that his followers remove his body parts, and they believed he would someday be resurrected to reclaim them, gaining physical perfection and immortality.

Later, Brad is arrested and tells Talos' history to Riley. Talos was exiled from Greece for sorcery and came to Egypt, where he fell in love, and in a pagan ceremony, married the Pharaoh's daughter, Nefriama. Neighbouring countries ordered the Pharaoh to kill Talos, as all who opposed him were struck with disease or tortured into believing his theology. To save Nefriama from death, the Pharaoh told her about Talos' upcoming execution, and she, in turn, told Talos. When the Pharaoh's army reached Talos' chamber, they saw Nefriama eating Talos' heart. The followers of Talos were all put to death, including Nefriama. Riley guesses that the murder victims are reincarnations of the Pharaoh's followers. Brad believes killing Sam (Nefriama's reincarnation) is the only way to stop Talos, who plans to be reborn when the planets align. Brad further explains that part of Talos' curse is that anyone who knows what is going on will be deemed crazy. After Riley steps out of the interrogating cell, Talos appears and kills Detective Bartone and Brad. A reborn Talos tracks down Sam to her apartment, but she manages to get away; however, Talos captures her after posing as a dog.

Riley, now believing whatever Brad told him, takes part in a ritual where Brad's dead body shows them the possible location Sam might be held hostage, an unfinished construction site. Meanwhile, bound with rags, Sam frees herself and stumbles upon a room where a huge nest of rags used to mummify the deceased forms a womb with dead bodies of Talos' victims lying around. As she watches, the water breaks from the womb, and a horrifying baby creature comes out, which quickly grows up into the true form of Talos with only the heart missing.

Riley and his group arrive at the construction site with eighteen minutes remaining before the planets are supposed to align, and Talos would regain his physical immortality. Riley and Claire separate from Butros and Professor Marcus. The latter encounter Talos who manipulates Marcus into killing Butros by strangling her. Meanwhile, Claire falls down and gravely injures her leg, forcing Riley to go forward without her. Somewhere else, Claire comes to Professor Marcus and, after a brief conversation, kills him by stabbing him with a scalpel, suggesting Talos manipulated Claire into killing Professor Marcus.

Riley finds Sam bound hands and foot, and Talos intercepts them. Sam begs Riley to kill her, which he does by shooting her to stop Talos from achieving what he wants. But, Riley himself is the reincarnation of Nefriama, and his heart is what Talos wants, for which he used Sam to lure him to the right place at the right time. Claire appears and takes out Riley's heart which Talos stuffs within himself just as the planets align.

The police arrive and pull out four dead bodies and a hysterical Claire. Elsewhere in London, the newly reborn Talos is shown disguised as Riley.

Cast

 Jason Scott Lee as Det. Riley
 Louise Lombard as Samantha Turkel
 Sean Pertwee as Bradley Cortese
 Lysette Anthony as Dr. Claire Mulrooney
 Michael Lerner as Prof. Marcus
 Jack Davenport as Det. Bartone
 Honor Blackman as Captain Shea
 Christopher Lee as Sir Richard Turkel
 Shelley Duvall as Edith Butros
 Gerard Butler as Burke
 Jon Polito as Parsons
 Ronan Vibert as Young
 Bill Treacher as Stuart
 Elizabeth Power as Mary
 Roger Morrissey as The Mummy
 Enzo Junior as Prince Talos

Production
The film was devised by Mulcahy and his one-time rock video collaborator Keith Williams as therapy to get over a skiing accident suffered by the director during Christmas 1995 as Williams knew of Mulcahy's affinity for the Hammer Mummy film. Tale of the Mummy was filmed in Luxembourg in the Fall of 1997 under the title of Talos the Mummy. In June 1998, it was announced Miramax's genre label Dimension Films had acquired distribution rights to the film.

Reception
Nicholas Sylvain of DVD Verdict derided the film, saying that while it had an interesting premise, some effects were "merely bad, while others border on the ludicrous", and that the story made no sense. Martin Liebman of Blu-ray.com gave it a 2.5/5 rating, conceding that the film is technically well-done, but calling the plotting unoriginal and characters bland. He recommended viewers only watch Christopher Lee's scenes. British Horror Films reviewer Chris Wood praised Tale of the Mummy as an homage to Hammer Films horror movies of mid-20th century, with the token inclusion of Lee.

Tale of the Mummy currently has a 17% on Rotten Tomatoes based on 6 reviews, with an average rating of 4.19/10.

Home media

The North American version is only 88 minutes, shorter than the European version of 115 minutes. A Blu-ray of the film was released by Echo Bridge Entertainment on March 20, 2012.

References

External links

1998 thriller films
1990s adventure films
American supernatural horror films
British supernatural horror films
English-language Luxembourgian films
Luxembourgian horror films
Mummy films
Films directed by Russell Mulcahy
Films scored by Stefano Mainetti
Films set in 1948
Films set in 1999
1998 horror films
1998 films
Miramax films
Dimension Films films
British horror films
Films about reincarnation
1990s English-language films
Films based on Egyptian mythology
Films about archaeology
Resurrection in film
1990s American films
1990s British films